Euchromius ramburiellus is a species of moth in the family Crambidae described by Philogène Auguste Joseph Duponchel in 1836. It is found in France, Spain, Portugal, Italy, Croatia, Romania, Bulgaria, Russia, North Africa (including Egypt, Libya, Tunisia, Algeria and Morocco), Afghanistan, Iran, Iraq, Jordan and Israel.

The wingspan is about 17.5 mm.

References

Moths described in 1836
Crambinae
Moths of Europe
Moths of Africa
Moths of Asia